Chen Zhouli (born November 11, 1989) is a professional wushu taolu athlete from China. He has won gold medals at the World Wushu Championships, Taolu World Cup, Asian Wushu Championships, and is a two-time gold medalist at the Asian Games. He also won the gold medal in men's taijiquan at the 2017 National Games of China and the silver medal at the 2021 National Games of China.

See also 

 List of Asian Games medalists in wushu
China national wushu team

References

External links 

 Athlete profile at the 2018 Asian Games

Living people
1989 births
Chinese wushu practitioners
Chinese tai chi practitioners
Asian Games gold medalists for China
Asian Games medalists in wushu
Wushu practitioners at the 2014 Asian Games
Wushu practitioners at the 2018 Asian Games
Medalists at the 2014 Asian Games
Medalists at the 2018 Asian Games
People from Putian
Sportspeople from Fujian